Zorko Cvetković (September 4, 1924 – December 13, 2017) was a Croatian electrical engineer and basketball player and coach. He represented the Yugoslavia national basketball team internationally.

Engineering career
Cvetković graduated from the Faculty of Electrical Engineering at the University of Zagreb in 1950, and later obtained a doctorate in 1983.

From 1947 to 1994, he was an external associate at the Department of High Voltage and Power of the Faculty of Electrical Engineering, University of Zagreb.

He was a secretary-general of the CIGRÉ branch in Croatia from 1989 to 2004.

Basketball career 
After the end of Second World War in 1945, Cvetković started to play basketball. He was a member of the Yugoslavia national team which participated at the 1947 FIBA European Championship. After retirement, he was a coach, a referee and the president of Mladost Zagreb.

References

1924 births
2017 deaths
Croatian electrical engineers
Croatian men's basketball players
Croatian basketball coaches
Faculty of Electrical Engineering and Computing, University of Zagreb alumni
Sportspeople from Osijek
Yugoslav men's basketball players
Yugoslav basketball coaches
Yugoslav engineers
Shooting guards
Burials at Mirogoj Cemetery